Lithocarpus bennettii is a tree in the beech family Fagaceae. It is named for the English botanist John Joseph Bennett.

Description
The greyish brown bark is smooth or fissured.

Distribution and habitat
Lithocarpus bennettii grows naturally in Thailand, Borneo, Peninsular Malaysia and Sumatra.

References

bennettii
Trees of Thailand
Trees of Borneo
Trees of Peninsular Malaysia
Trees of Sumatra
Plants described in 1856